FARME also known as Functional Antibiotic Resistance Metagenomic Element is a database that compiles publicly available DNA elements and predicted proteins that confer antibiotic resistance, regulatory elements and mobile genetic elements. It is the first database to focus on functional metagenomics. This allows the database to understand 99% of bacteria which cannot be cultured, the relationship between environmental antibiotic resistance sequences and antibiotic genes derived from cultured isolates. This information was derived from 20 metagenomics projects from GenBank. Also from GenBank are the protein sequence predictions and annotations.

See also 
 Antimicrobial Resistance databases

References 

Metagenomics
Biological databases
Antimicrobial resistance organizations